Louis Daquin (20 May 1908 – 2 October 1980) was a French film director, screenwriter and actor. He directed 14 films between 1938 and 1963. He also appeared in 11 films between 1937 and 1979.

Selected filmography
 The Man from Nowhere (1937)
 Strange Inheritance (1943)
 First on the Rope (1944)
 Patrie (1946)
 The Bouquinquant Brothers (1947)
 The Perfume of the Lady in Black (1949)
 Bel Ami (1955)
 Ciulinii Bărăganului (1958) (co-director, with Gheorghe Vitanidis)
 The Opportunists (1959) 
 La Foire aux cancres (1963)

References

External links
 
 

1908 births
1980 deaths
People from Calais
French film directors
French male film actors
20th-century French male actors